The Lower Athabasca Region is a land-use framework region in northern Alberta, Canada. One of seven in the province, each is intended to develop and implement a regional plan, complementing the planning efforts of member municipalities in order to coordinate future growth. Corresponding roughly to major watersheds while following municipal boundaries, these regions are managed by Alberta Environment and Parks.

Communities

The following municipalities are contained in the Lower Athabasca Region.

 

Cities
 Cold Lake

Urban service areas
 Fort McMurray
 Lac la Biche
 Plamondon

Towns
 Bonnyville

Villages
 Glendon

Summer villages
 Bonnyville Beach
 Pelican Narrows

Hamlets
 Anzac
 Ardmore
 Beaver Crossing
 Beaver Lake
 Beaverdam
 Cherry Grove
 Conklin
 Fort Chipewyan
 Fort Kent
 Fort Mackay
 Gregoire Lake Estates
 Hylo
 Iron River
 Janvier South
 La Corey
 Saprae Creek
 Therien
 Venice

Métis settlements
 Elizabeth Metis Settlement
 Fishing Lake Metis Settlement

Municipal districts
 Municipal District of Bonnyville

Specialized municipalities
 Lac La Biche County
 Regional Municipality of Wood Buffalo

Improvement districts
 Improvement District No. 349

Indian reserves
 Allison Bay 219
 Beaver Lake 131
 Charles Lake 225
 Chipewyan 201
 Chipewyan 201A
 Chipewyan 201B
 Chipewyan 201C
 Chipewyan 201D
 Chipewyan 201E
 Chipewyan 201F
 Chipewyan 201G
 Clearwater 175
 Cold Lake 149
 Cold Lake 149A
 Cold Lake 149B
 Cold Lake 149C
 Colin Lake 223
 Cowper Lake 194A
 Devil's Gate 220
 Dog Head 218
 Fort McKay 174
 Fort McKay 174C
 Fort McKay 174D
 Gregoire Lake 176
 Gregoire Lake 176A
 Gregoire Lake 176B
 Heart Lake 167
 Heart Lake 167A
 Hokedhe Tue 196E
 Janvier 194
 Kehewin 123
 Ki Tue 196D
 Li Deze 196C
 Namur Lake 174B
 Namur River 174A
 Old Fort 217
 Sand Point 221
 Thabacha Nare 196
 Thebathi 196
 Tsu Kadhe 196F
 Tsu Tue 196G
 The Jere Ghaili 196B
 Winefred Lake 194B

References

Alberta land-use framework regions